Nampicuan, officially the Municipality of Nampicuan, is a 5th class municipality in the province of Nueva Ecija, Philippines. According to the 2020 census, it has a population of 14,471 people.

History
The name Nampicuan emanated from the word “Nagpicuan” which means a curve road, originated in a trail called “Curva” as inhabitants of Pangasinan used to call. According to the first settlers, the site was a sitio named used “Surgue” or ‘SULI” situated in the eastern part of what eventually became the poblacion of Nampicuan and was the point where the feeder road from Moncada, Tarlac turned abruptly north-east towards the town of Cuyapo, Nueva Ecija.

The first known settlers were the Ilocanos. They came from Paoay, Ilocos Region, Pangasinan and Zambales. In 1880, having found the soil productive for agricultural purposes, the early settlers cleared the place, cultivate the land and cut down the trees. The trees were sawed into lumber out of which their houses were constructed. At time passes and population continues to grow, more and more demands are made for land and its resources. So much so, on the end of the 19th century, the barrio Nampicuan became a municipality and the first “alcalde mayors” were Andres Tabilangan and Feliciano Cuaresma. Before its formal creation and declaration as a municipality, Nampicuan was then a part and under the political jurisdiction of the town of Cuyapo.

In 1903, while the Philippines was still under the American Occupation, Nampicuan was reverted to the status of a barrio of the Cuyapo town. Upon proper presentation however of the prominent residents of this place, Nampicuan was again elevated to the status of municipality. In 1907, the first church was constructed led by REV. Luis Corpuz and the establishment of Gabaldon Primary School under the first Principal/Teacher, Clodualdo Bringas. After a year Nampicuan become a third class municipality of Nueva Ecija with the first leaders, President Laureano O. Gonzales and Vice – President Simeon Quiaoit.

Geography

Barangays
Nampicuan is politically subdivided into 21 barangays.

 Alemania
 Ambassador Alzate Village
 Cabaducan East (Poblacion)
 Cabaducan West (Poblacion)
 Cabawangan
 East Central Poblacion
 Edy
 Maeling
 Mayantoc
 Medico
 Monic
 North poblacion
 Northwest Poblacion
 Estacion
 West Poblacion
 Recuerdo
 South Central Poblacion
 Southeast Poblacion
 Southwest Poblacion
 Tony
 West Central Poblacion.

Climate

Demographics

Economy

Education

 Nampicuan Central School
 Nampicuan Christian Academy
 Alzate Village Elementary School
 United Methodist Church Learning Central
 Cabawangan Elementary School
 Mayantoc Elementary School
 Recuerdo Elementary School
 Monic Elementary School
 Maeling Elementary School
 Nampicuan High School
 St. Pius X Institute of Nampicuan, Inc.
 Recuerdo National High School

In 2020, a bill was filed at the Congress of the Philippines to construct a regular NEUST campus in Nampicuan.

References

External links

 [ Philippine Standard Geographic Code]
Philippine Census Information
Local Governance Performance Management System

Municipalities of Nueva Ecija